Billboard Brasil was a monthly Brazilian magazine launched on October 10, 2009, with a print-run of over 40,000 copies. It is distributed nationwide by Brazil's biggest distributor Dinap. The Billboard charts printed in the magazine and on its website are accepted as Brazil's official charts. The last print issue was the 49th, in July 2014, with the following one only getting a digital version for tablets. The magazine eventually stopped being published, only updating its website until closing its operations in 2019.

Content
About 60% of the editorial pages are produced in Brazil, with the remainder being translated from the international edition.

Billboard Brasil follows the basic format of the American Billboard, featuring both Brasil Hot 100 and Billboard 200 charts, articles on regional and international music, as well as regional and international charts. The charts are done based on the Crowley Broadcast Analysis report, which monitors 265 radio stations around the country, and which already provided this service for the music industry prior to Billboards launch. Brazil was the third country to launch a print affiliate of the American magazine, following Russia and Turkey.

Charts
Billboard charts are accepted as Brazil's official charts, covering airplay data collected by Crowley/Music Media from 14 different cities. The overall chart is the Brasil Hot 100 Airplay, which is also split between regional music - forró, Axé, sertanejo, pagode - on Brasil Hot Popular Songs, and  pop music - both Brazilian and foreign - on Brasil Hot Pop Songs. Regional charts for each of the 14 cities are also given. The charts include:

 Brasil Hot 100 Airplay
 Brasil Hot Pop Songs
 Brasil Hot Popular Songs
 Brasil Hot Regional (by city)
 Belo Horizonte Hot Songs
 Brasília Hot Songs
 Campinas Hot Songs
 Curitiba Hot Songs
 Goiânia Hot Songs
 Fortaleza Hot Songs
 Porto Alegre Hot Songs
 Recife Hot Songs
 Ribeirão Preto Hot Songs
 Rio de Janeiro Hot Songs
 Salvador Hot Songs
 São Paulo Hot Songs

History
Billboard Brasil was launched by Bill Werde, editor-in-chief of the American Billboard magazine, in Brazil in September 2009. Werde expressed his appreciation of Brazilian music, and stated that Billboard would monitor the local market. The magazine is published on a monthly basis.

The first number-one song on the main chart was "Halo" by Beyoncé. Its first cover was Roberto Carlos, Brazil's best-selling music artist. In May 2010, "Tapa na Cara" (English: "Slap in the Face") by Brazilian duo Zezé Di Camargo e Luciano became the first ever national song to reach number-one song on the main chart, following six consecutive months of Mariah Carey's cover version of "I Want to Know What Love Is" holding this position.

The first number-one songs

References

External links
 Official page

2009 establishments in Brazil
Billboard (magazine)
Magazines published in Brazil
Monthly magazines published in Brazil
Brazilian record charts
Listings magazines
Magazines about the media
Magazines established in 2009
Mass media in São Paulo
Portuguese-language magazines
Defunct magazines published in Brazil
Magazines disestablished in 2019
Online magazines with defunct print editions